Kosovo is a rural locality (a village) in Molokovsky District of Tver Oblast, Russia.

Rural localities in Molokovsky District
Vesyegonsky Uyezd